This is a list of newspapers in Ohio. Eight of these are part of the Ohio News Organization and most are part of the Ohio Newspaper Association.

Major papersThis is a list of daily newspapers currently published in Ohio. For weekly newspapers, see List of newspapers in Ohio.

 Akron Beacon Journal - Akron
 The Repository - Canton
 The Cincinnati Enquirer - Cincinnati
 The Plain Dealer - Cleveland
 The Columbus Dispatch - Columbus
 Dayton Daily News - Dayton
 The Blade - Toledo
 Tribune Chronicle - Warren
 The Vindicator - YoungstownDaily newspapers
 Akron Beacon Journal - Akron
 The Alliance Review - Alliance
 Ashland Times-Gazette (Monday-Saturday) - Ashland
 Star Beacon - Ashtabula
 The Athens Messenger - Athens
 The Daily Jeffersonian- Cambridge
 The Repository - Canton
Geauga County Maple Leaf - Chardon
 Chillicothe Gazette - Chillicothe
 American Israelite - Cincinnati
 The Cincinnati Enquirer - Cincinnati
 Ameriska Domovina - Cleveland
 The Daily Standard - Celina
 The Plain Dealer - Cleveland
 The Columbus Dispatch - Columbus
 The Lantern (student newspaper at Ohio State University) - Columbus
 Coshocton Tribune - Coshocton
 Dayton Daily News - Dayton
 Dayton City Paper - Dayton
 The Crescent-News - Defiance
 The Review - East Liverpool
 The Chronicle-Telegram - Elyria
 The Courier - Findlay
 The News-Messenger - Fremont
 Gallipolis Daily Tribune - Gallipolis
 Journal News - Hamilton
 Ironton Tribune - Ironton
 Record-Courier - Kent-Ravenna
 Lancaster Eagle-Gazette - Lancaster
 The Lima News - Lima
 Morning Journal - Lisbon and Columbiana County
 The Logan Daily - Logan
 The Morning Journal - Lorain
 Mansfield News Journal - Mansfield
 The Marietta Times - Marietta
 Martins Ferry Times Leader - Martins Ferry
 The Marysville Journal-Tribune - Marysville
 Medina County Gazette Leader Post – Medina
 The Independent - Massillon
 The Middletown Journal - Middletown
 The Times Reporter - New Philadelphia
 The Advocate - Newark
 Norwalk Reflector - Norwalk
 Norwalk Ohio News - Norwalk
 Piqua Daily Call - Piqua
 The Daily Sentinel - Pomeroy
 Portsmouth Daily Times - Portsmouth
 Salem News - Salem
 The Sandusky Register - Sandusky
 Scioto Valley Guardian - Chillicothe
 The Sidney Daily News - Sidney
 Springfield News-Sun - Springfield
 The Springfield Paper - Springfield
 The Wittenberg Torch (Student Newspaper of Wittenberg University) - Springfield
 Herald-Star - Steubenville
 Tribune Chronicle - Warren
 Record Herald - Washington Court House
 The News-Herald - Willoughby
 The Daily Record - Wooster
 The Vindicator - Youngstown
 Times Recorder - Zanesville

Nondaily newspapers

 The Buchtelite (student newspaper at the University of Akron) - Akron
 The Suburbanite - Akron
 Mr. Thrifty Shoppers - Alliance
 The Athens News - Athens
 The Post (student newspaper at Ohio University) - Athens
 Cleveland Jewish News - Beachwood
 News on the Green - Brookfield
 Harrison News-Herald - Cadiz
 The Journal and The Noble County Leader - Caldwell
 Cincinnati CityBeat - Cincinnati
 The Cincinnati Herald - Cincinnati
 The Catholic Telegraph - Cincinnati
 Sun News - Cleveland
 Call and Post - Cleveland
 Dirva - Cleveland
 West Park Times - Cleveland
 Columbus Alive - Columbus
 The Columbus Free Press - Columbus
 The Ohio State Sentinel - Columbus
 The Other Paper - Columbus
 Active Dayton - Dayton
 Dayton City Paper - Dayton
 Flyer News (student newspaper at the University of Dayton) - Dayton
 The Oakwood Register - Dayton
 The Register-Herald - Eaton
 The Enon Eagle - Enon
 Sunday Times-Sentinel - Gallipolis
 The Neighborhood News-Garfield Heights Tribune - Garfield Heights
 The Weekly Villager  - Garrettsville
 The Granville (Ohio) Sentinel - Granville
 "The Highland County Press" - Hillsboro
 The Telegram - Jackson
 Gazette Newspapers - Jefferson, Ohio
 The Western Star - Lebanon
 the419 - Lima
 Maple Heights Press - Maple Heights
 The Marietta Register - Marietta
 The Vinton County Courier - McArthur
 The Community Post - Minster
 New Carlisle News - New Carlisle
 The Miami Student (student newspaper at Miami University) - Oxford
 The Oxford Press - Oxford
 Perry County Tribune - New Lexington
 The News - Newcomerstown
 Paulding County Progress - Paulding County
 The West Bend News - Paulding County
 The Beacon - Port Clinton
 Springboro Star-Press - Springboro
 Ohio Valley Newspaper - Steubenville
 Swanton Enterprise - Swanton
 Tippecanoe Gazette - Tipp City
 Toledo Free Press - Toledo
 Troy Tribune - Troy
 Fulton County Expositor - Wauseon
 The Pike County News Watchman - Waverly
 The People's Defender - West Union
 Monroe County Beacon - Woodsfield
 Yellow Springs News - Yellow Springs
 The Blade - Toledo
 The Times Bulletin - Van Wert

Defunct newspapers
 The Barberton Herald (1923-2022)
 Holmes County Republican
 The Yellow Springs American (from June 11, 1953 through at least April 15, 1954)

See also

References

External links
 . (Survey of local news existence and ownership in 21st century)